The men's road race at the 1997 UCI Road World Championships took place on October 12, 1997, in San Sebastián, Basque Country, Spain. The championship was won by the French Laurent Brochard, completing a French double in the Men's Elite Races after Laurent Jalabert won the Individual Time Trial a few days before. The men's road race featured 19 laps of 13.5 km, amounting to 265.5 kilometres of racing. There were a total of 161 starters, with 87 cyclists finishing the race.

Final classification

Abandons

References
 Full results

Men's Road Race
UCI Road World Championships – Men's road race

it:Campionato del mondo di ciclismo su strada 1997
nl:Wereldkampioenschap wielrennen 1997